Quartets is a dedicated deck card game with the object to collect 4 cards in a series, similar to Go Fish and Happy Families.

Each pack originally contained 32 cards, divided into 8 groups of 4 cards, unlike a normal 52 pack of playing cards, but the number of groups changed from company to company.

The game went on to inspire Top Trumps.

Gameplay
Quartets is played with three or more players, with the aim to win all the quartets (sets of four). Each card usually has a number and letter (1A, 1B, 1C, 1D, 2A, 2B etc. ) in the top right or left corner of the card.

The cards are shuffled and an equal number are dealt to all the players, who hold them without revealing their hand to other player's. The player to the dealer's left starts by asking another player if they had a certain card (example, card 4C) which would help the player create a quartet. If the player does have the card, then they hand it over. If the player does not have the card, then it becomes her or his turn to ask.

When a quartet is created, or a complete quartet was dealt, then the cards creating the quartet are placed in front of the player. The game ends when all the quartets have been created. The winner is the person with the most quartets.

References

Quartet group
Card games introduced in the 1960s
Dedicated deck card games